Narince is a village in the Bozyazı district of Mersin Province, Turkey. It is situated to the northwest of Bozyazı. The population of the village was 492 as of 2012.

References

Villages in Bozyazı District